Acromantis nicobarica is a species of praying mantis native to the Nicobar Islands, a part of India near Myanmar.

See also
List of mantis genera and species

References

Nicobar
Mantodea of Southeast Asia
Endemic fauna of the Nicobar Islands
Insects of India
Insects described in 1995